The year 1953 in television involved some significant events. Below is a list of television-related events during 1953.

Events

January 19 – 68% of all U.S. television sets are tuned in to I Love Lucy to watch Lucy give birth to little Ricky.
January 23 – TP1, a predecessor of TVP1, a member of Telewizja Polska, becomes the first television station in Poland when it officially begins a regular broadcasting service, from Warsaw.
February 1
Japanese television begins when JOAK-TV begins broadcasting from Tokyo.
General Electric Theater airs for the first time on CBS.
February 18 – Lucille Ball and Desi Arnaz sign an $8,000,000 contract to continue the I Love Lucy television series through 1955.
February 26 – Fulton J. Sheen, on his program Life Is Worth Living, reads Shakespeare's Julius Caesar, with the names of high-ranking Soviet officials replacing the main characters. At the end of the reading, Sheen intones that "Stalin must one day meet his judgment". Stalin dies one week later.
March 17 – Patrick Troughton becomes television's first Robin Hood, playing the eponymous folk hero in the first of six half-hour episodes of Robin Hood, shown weekly until April 21 on the BBC Television Service.
March 19 – The 25th Academy Awards is broadcast by NBC in the U.S. This becomes the first Academy Awards ceremony to be televised.
March 25 – CBS concedes victory to RCA in the war over color television standards.
April 3 – TV Guide is published for the first time in the United States, with 10 editions and a circulation of 1,562,000.
May 1 – Czechoslovak Television becomes the first television station in the country when it officially begins a regular broadcasting service, from Prague; this station will separate into Česká televize and Slovenská televízia in January 1993. 
May 25 – KUHT in Houston becomes the first non-commercial educational TV station in the United States.
June 2 – The Coronation of Queen Elizabeth II is televised by the BBC from London. Sales of TV sets in the United Kingdom rise sharply in the weeks leading up to the event. It is also one of the earliest broadcasts to be deliberately recorded for posterity and still exists in its entirety. More than twenty million viewers around the world watch the coverage; to ensure Canadians could see it on the same day, British Royal Air Force Canberras fly film of the ceremony across the Atlantic Ocean to be broadcast by the Canadian Broadcasting Corporation, the first non-stop flight between the United Kingdom and the Canadian mainland. In Goose Bay, Labrador, the film is transferred to a Royal Canadian Air Force CF-100 jet fighter for the further trip to Montreal. In all, three such voyages are made as the coronation proceeds.
July 18 
The Quatermass Experiment, first of the famous Quatermass science-fiction serials by Nigel Kneale, begins its run on the BBC in the U.K.
The Tonight Show begins as a local New York variety show, originally titled The Knickerbocker Beer Show.
August 28 – Nippon Television, becomes the first regular broadcast service to start in Tokyo, Japan. The first program is Hato no kyujitsu.
August 30 – NBC's Kukla, Fran, and Ollie is the first publicly announced experimental broadcast of a program in RCA compatible color.
September 27 – RecordTV, a major free-to-air television network in Brazil, becomes the first official regular broadcasting service to start in Sao Paulo.
October 18 – A live television adaptation of the Shakespeare play King Lear starring Orson Welles is aired on CBS as part of the Omnibus series.
October 19 – Arthur Godfrey dismisses Julius La Rosa on the air.
 October 23 – Alto Broadcasting System of the Philippines makes the first television broadcast in Southeast Asia through DZAQ-TV. Alto Broadcasting System is the predecessor of what is now ABS-CBN Corporation.
October 31 – Le NIR, predecessor of Één, becomes the first television station in Belgium, when it officially begins a regular broadcasting service. 
November 15 – Radio Caracas Television (RCTV) becomes the first television station in Venezuela when it officially begins a regular broadcast service.  
November 22 – RCA airs (with special permission from the Federal Communications Commission (FCC) in the U.S.) the first commercial color program in compatible color, The Colgate Comedy Hour with Donald O'Connor.
November 26 – NBC broadcasts its first national telecast of the Macy's Thanksgiving Day Parade.
December 2 – BBC broadcasts its 'Television Symbol' for the first time, the first animated television presentation symbol.
December 12 – The DuMont Television Network televises its first ever National Basketball Association game with the Boston Celtics defeating the Baltimore Bullets 106–75. This marked the first year the NBA had a national television contract. This was the only year of NBA coverage on DuMont; the Saturday afternoon package moved to NBC for the  season, mainly because NBC could clear the games on far more stations that DuMont could.
December 17 – The FCC reverses its 1951 decision and approves the RCA/NTSC color system.
December 24 – Dragnet becomes the first filmed drama to be televised in color each year as a network television program. However, only this one episode, entitled "The Big Little Jesus", is filmed in color during the 1950s; the show returns in the late 1960s in color.

Programs/programmes

Series on the air in 1953
Adventures of Superman (1952–1958)
American Bandstand (1952–1989)
Author Meets the Critics (1947–1954)
Bozo the Clown (1949–)
Candid Camera (1948–)
Cisco Kid (1950–1956)
Come Dancing (UK) (1949–1995)
Death Valley Days (1952–1975)
Dragnet (1951–1959)
Gillette Cavalcade of Sports (1946–1960)
Hallmark Hall of Fame (1951–)
Hawkins Falls (1950, 1951–1955)
Hockey Night in Canada (1952–)
Howdy Doody (1947–1960)
I Love Lucy (1951–1960)
Juvenile Jury (1947–1954)
Kraft Television Theater (1947–1958)
Kukla, Fran and Ollie (1947–1957)
Life is Worth Living (1952–1957)
Life with Elizabeth (1952–1955)
Love of Life (1951–1980)
Martin Kane, Private Eye (1949–1954)
Meet the Press (1947–)
Muffin the Mule (1946–1955)
My Little Margie (1952–1955)
Omnibus (1952–1961)
Our Miss Brooks (1952-1956)
Search for Tomorrow (1951–1986)
Television Newsreel (UK) (1948–1954)
The Adventures of Ozzie and Harriet (1952–1966)
The Ed Sullivan Show (1948–1971)
The George Burns and Gracie Allen Show (1950–1958)
The Goldbergs (1949–1955)
The Guiding Light (1952–)
The Jack Benny Show (1950–1965)
The Roy Rogers Show (1951–1957)
The Texaco Star Theater (1948–1953); the show was renamed Buick-Berle Show this year (1953–1954)
The Today Show (1952–)
The Voice of Firestone (1949–1963)
This Is Your Life (U.S.; 1952–1961)
Truth or Consequences (1950–1988)
What's My Line (1950–1967)
Your Hit Parade (1950–1959)
Your Show of Shows (1950–1954)

Debuts
February 10 – Romper Room (1953–1994)
June 20 – Bank on the Stars on CBS (1953), then NBC (1954)
July 11 - Medallion Theatre on CBS (1953-1954)
July 20 – The Good Old Days on BBC Television (1953–1983)
August 18 - Judge for Yourself with Fred Allen on NBC (1953–1954)
September 13 – Jukebox Jury on ABC (1953–1954)
September 13 - The George Jessel Show on ABC.
September 29 – Make Room For Daddy with Danny Thomas on ABC (1953-1957), then moved to CBS (1957–1964)
October 2 – The Pepsi-Cola Playhouse, an anthology series, The Comeback Story, a reality show, and The Pride of the Family, a situation comedy, all on ABC
October 5 – Of Many Things, panel discussion show with Dr. Bergen Evans on ABC (1953–1954)
October 8 – Where's Raymond?, starring Ray Bolger on ABC (in season 2, it is known as The Ray Milland Show) (1953–1955)
October 11 - The Man Behind the Badge on CBS (1953-1954)
November 11
The current affairs series Panorama on BBC Television; now the longest-running program on British television
The public affairs series Answers for Americans on ABC
December 1 – CBC Theatre on the Canadian Broadcasting Corporation [later known as General Motors Theatre (1954–1956) and General Motors Presents (1958–1961)]
 Place the Face, with principal host Bill Cullen, on CBS (1953–1954); then transferred to NBC (1954–1955)

Ending this year

Births

References